Inverclyde West is one of the seven wards used to elect members of the Inverclyde Council. It elects three Councillors.

The ward consists entirely of the town of Gourock on the Firth of Clyde. In 2019, the ward had a population of 10,411.

Councillors

Election Results

2022 Election
2022 Inverclyde Council election

2017 Election
2017 Inverclyde Council election

2012 Election
2012 Inverclyde Council election

2007 Election
2007 Inverclyde Council election

References

Wards of Inverclyde
Gourock